The 1978 German Open was a combined men's and women's tennis tournament played on outdoor red clay courts. The men's tournament was part of the 1978 Colgate-Palmolive Grand Prix circuit, categorized as a four-star event, while the women's tournament was part of the Colgate Series and classified as an A category event. It was the 70th edition of the tournament and took place at the Am Rothenbaum in Hamburg, West Germany, from 15 May through 21 May 1978. Guillermo Vilas and Mima Jaušovec, both first-seeded, won the singles titles.

Finals

Men's singles
 Guillermo Vilas defeated  Wojciech Fibak 6–2, 6–4, 6–2

Women's singles
 Mima Jaušovec defeated  Virginia Ruzici 6–2, 6–3

Men's doubles
 Tom Okker /  Wojciech Fibak defeated  Antonio Muñoz /  Víctor Pecci 6–2, 6–4

Women's doubles
 Mima Jaušovec /  Virginia Ruzici defeated  Katja Ebbinghaus /  Helga Masthoff 6–4, 5–7, 6–0

References

External links
 
 Women's Tennis Association (WTA) – tournament edition details
 International Tennis Federation (ITF) – tournament edition details (men)
 International Tennis Federation (ITF) – tournament edition details (women)

German Open
Hamburg European Open
1978 in West German sport
1978 in German tennis